The John von Neumann Prize (until 2019 named John von Neumann Lecture Prize) was established in 1959 with funds from IBM and other industry corporations, and is awarded for "outstanding and distinguished contributions to the field of applied mathematical sciences and for the effective communication of these ideas to the community". It is considered the highest honor bestowed by the Society for Industrial and Applied Mathematics (SIAM). The recipient receives a monetary award and presents a survey lecture at the SIAM Annual Meeting.

Selection process

Anybody is able to nominate a mathematician for the prize. Nominations are reviewed by a selection committee, consisting of members of SIAM who serve two-year appointments. The committee selects one recipient for the prize nine months before the SIAM Annual Meeting and forwards their nomination to SIAM's Executive Committee and Vice President for Programs.

Past lecturers

1960: Lars Valerian Ahlfors
1961: Mark Kac
1962: Jean Leray
1963: Stanislaw M. Ulam
1964: Solomon Lefschetz
1965: Freeman J. Dyson
1966: Eugene P. Wigner
1967: Chia-Chiao Lin
1968: Peter D. Lax
1969: George F. Carrier
1970: James H. Wilkinson
1971: Paul A. Samuelson
1974: Jule Charney
1975: Sir James Lighthill
1976: Rene Thom
1977: Kenneth J. Arrow
1978: Peter Henrici
1979: Kurt O. Friedrichs
1980: Keith Stewartson
1981: Garrett Birkhoff
1982: David Slepian
1983: Joseph B. Keller
1984: Jurgen Moser
1985: John W. Tukey
1986: Jacques-Louis Lions
1987: Richard M. Karp
1988: Germund Dahlquist
1989: Stephen Smale
1990: Andrew J. Majda
1991: No award was made
1992: R. Tyrrell Rockafellar
1993: No award was made
1994: Martin D. Kruskal
1995: No award was made
1996: Carl de Boor
1997: William Kahan
1998: Olga Ladyzhenskaya
1999: Charles S. Peskin
2000: Persi Diaconis
2001: David L. Donoho
2002: Eric S. Lander
2003: Heinz-Otto Kreiss
2004: Alan C. Newell
2005: Jerrold E. Marsden
2006: George C. Papanicolaou
2007: Nancy Kopell
2008: David Gottlieb
2009: Franco Brezzi
2010: Bernd Sturmfels
2011: Ingrid Daubechies
2012: Sir John M. Ball
2013: Stanley J. Osher
2014: Leslie F. Greengard
2015: Jennifer Tour Chayes
2016: Donald E. Knuth
2017: Bernard J. Matkowsky
2018: Charles F. Van Loan
2019: Margaret H. Wright
2020: Nick Trefethen
2021: Chi-Wang Shu
2022: Leah Keshet

See also

 List of mathematics awards

References

Awards of the Society for Industrial and Applied Mathematics
Awards established in 1959
Lecture series